Hwang Hye-suk (born 5 August 1993) is a South Korean biathlete. She represented South Korea at the Biathlon World Championships 2016.

References

External links

1993 births
Living people
South Korean female biathletes
21st-century South Korean women